Heen is a surname and given name. Notable people with this name include:

Surname
 Arne Randers Heen (1905–1991), Norwegian mountain climber and member of the Norwegian resistance
 Sheila Heen, American author, educator and public speaker
 Walter Heen (born 1928), American lawyer, politician and judge

Given name
 Heen Banda Dissanayaka (28 August 1937), Sri Lankan civil servant
 Heen Banda Udurawana (1900–1989), Sri Lankan politician

See also
 Hean (disambiguation)

Sinhalese masculine given names